Russian romance ( románs)  is a type of sentimental art song with hints of Gypsy influence that was developed in Imperial Russia by such composers as Nikolai Titov (1800-1875), Alexander Alyabyev (1787–1851), Alexander Varlamov (1801–48), and Alexander Gurilyov (1803–58).

By the early 20th century, several types of the Russian romance had emerged. An elite type of the Italianate opera-influenced song known as the "salon romance" is contrasted to the lower-class genre of "cruel romance" which features "sentimental courtship, illicit love, pained rejection, and often suicide". The latter is supposed to have given birth to the Russian chanson.

The Russian romance had its heyday in the 1910s and 1920s when the top performers included Anastasia Vyaltseva, Varvara Panina, Nadezhda Plevitskaya, Tamara Tsereteli, Pyotr Leshchenko, and Alexander Vertinsky. In the early Soviet era the genre was less favoured, as it was seen as a vestige of the pre-revolutionary "decadent and bourgeois" sensibility through much of the 20th century.

A new generation of singers, such as Valentina Ponomaryova and Nani Bregvadze, emerged in the 1970s. Several vocalists from the pre-WWII era, including Izabella Yurieva (1902–2000), Vadim Kozin (1903–1994) and Alla Bayanova (1914–2011), also returned to prominence in the late Soviet years. Alexander Malinin, Sergey Zakharov and Oleg Pogudin are among the Russian romance singers active in the 21st century. In 1994, . Alexander Malinin received the World Music Award as best selling Russian artist.

César Cui's 1895 book Russian Art Song: A Study of Its Development was translated in J.R. Walker’s Classical Essays on the Development of Russian Art Songs (Northfield, MN, 1993).

Notable songs 
 Black Eyes
 Shine, Shine, My Star
 Along the Long Road
 Evening Bell
 Les Chrysanthemes

References

External links 
Russian composers and singer-songwriters of 19th century (English), an educational site
Synthesis of poetry and music (Russian), a site dedicated to Russian romance

Russian styles of music
Song forms
Art songs
Romance (music)
Russian songs